Antonio ("Toni") Brogno (born 19 July 1973) is a retired Belgian football striker who was last on the books of Olympic Charleroi. Before that he also played for Sedan, OH Leuven, Westerlo and Sporting Charleroi, where his brother Dante Brogno was an assistant manager.  He finished top scorer of the Belgian First Division in 1999–2000 with the same number of goals (30) as Ole Martin Årst. He also played for the national football team 7 times.

References

Toni Brogno Belgian league statistics at the Belgian Soccer Database 

Belgian footballers
Association football forwards
Belgian Pro League players
Challenger Pro League players
R. Charleroi S.C. players
K.V.C. Westerlo players
CS Sedan Ardennes players
Ligue 1 players
Belgian expatriate footballers
Expatriate footballers in France
Oud-Heverlee Leuven players
R. Olympic Charleroi Châtelet Farciennes players
Belgium international footballers
1973 births
Living people
Belgian people of Italian descent
Sportspeople from Charleroi
Footballers from Hainaut (province)